Marc Smith (born 1960) is a British bridge player, columnist and writer.  Marc Smith represented Great Britain as a junior, winning the 1985 European Union Junior Teams Championship. He has a host of wins in national events, and reached the final of the World Mixed Pairs Championship playing with his wife, Charlotte. His book, co-authored with Barbara Seagram, 25 Bridge Conventions You Should Know, won the American Bridge Teachers' Association 1999 Shirley Silverman Award for Best Student Book.

Bridge columns
 Bridge (Britain)
 Bridge Plus (Britain)
 The OKbridge Spectator, 
 ACBL Bridge Bulletin (USA)

Publications

References

External links 
 
  

1960 births
British and Irish contract bridge players
Contract bridge writers
Living people
Date of birth missing (living people)
Place of birth missing (living people)